Quassiremus polyclitellum is an eel in the family Ophichthidae (worm/snake eels). It was described by Peter Henry John Castle in 1996. It is a marine, temperate water-dwelling eel which is known from New Zealand, in the southwestern Pacific Ocean. It dwells at a depth range , and inhabits rocky surfaces.

References

Ophichthidae
Fish described in 1996